Joseph "Habao" Texidor, also known as Joe "Habao" Texidor, (July 23, 1941—October 19, 2007) was a Puerto Rican jazz percussionist known for his work with Rahsaan Roland Kirk during the late 1960s and throughout the 1970s.

He played percussion and created a sound tree to accommodate every percussive instrument he had or made.

Personal life 

Texidor was married to Donna Dinberg Texidor (September 3, 1942—April 11, 2009), a librarian. They had one daughter. He had three other daughters from a previous marriage.

Discography 

With Rahsaan Roland Kirk

 Volunteered Slavery, 1969
 Rahsaan Rahsaan, 1970
 Natural Black Inventions: Root Strata, 1971
 Blacknuss, 1972
 Bright Moments, 1973
 Other Folks' Music, 1976
 The Return of the 5000 Lb. Man, 1976

Death 
Texidor died in Ottawa, Canada on October 19, 2007.

References 

1941 births
2007 deaths
American jazz percussionists